The Allman Brothers Band was an American blues rock band from Macon, Georgia. Formed in March 1969 by brothers Duane (guitar) and Gregg Allman (organ, vocals), the group originally also included guitarist and vocalist Dickey Betts, bassist Berry Oakley, and drummers Butch Trucks and Jai Johanny "Jaimoe" Johanson. The band went through multiple personnel changes and broke up twice before retiring in 2014, when the lineup included founding members Gregg Allman, Trucks and Johanson, plus guitarist and vocalist Warren Haynes, percussionist Marc Quiñones, bassist Oteil Burbridge and guitarist Derek Trucks.

History

1969–1976
The Allman Brothers Band was founded in March 1969 by Duane and Gregg Allman with Dickey Betts, Berry Oakley, Butch Trucks and Jai Johanny "Jaimoe" Johanson. Just two years after forming, however, Duane Allman died in a motorcycle crash in Macon on October 29, 1971. The guitarist was not replaced, although Chuck Leavell was added as a second keyboardist in 1972 after the band performed as a five-piece. On November 11, 1972, the group lost a second member when Oakley died in a motorcycle accident similar to Allman's. He was replaced by Lamar Williams, a childhood friend of Johanson's. In May 1976, the group disbanded after Allman testified in the trial of road manager John "Scooter" Herring, who was accused of drug dealing, with the rest of the band publicly condemning his decision to do so.

1978–1982
Two years later, in August 1978, the solo bands of Betts and Allman combined for a performance in New York City, sparking rumors of an Allman Brothers Band reformation. By the end of the year the band had returned, with Allman, Betts, Trucks and Johanson joined by new guitarist "Dangerous" Dan Toler and bassist David "Rook" Goldflies. After the release of Enlightened Rogues and Reach for the Sky, Mike Lawler was added on keyboards and Johanson was replaced by Toler's brother David. The pair performed on 1981's Brothers of the Road, before the group broke up again in January 1982. Betts and Allman later toured together with their respective solo bands during 1986.

During their 1982-1989 hiatus the band reunited twice. Their first reunion took place on July 12, 1986, when they were invited by the Charlie Daniels Band to play at their annual Volunteer Jam, which took place that year at Starwood Amphitheater in Nashville, TN. Daniels himself introduced the band, before Gregg Allman, Dickey Betts, Butch Trucks, and Jaimoe took the stage, flanked by Dan Toler and Chuck Leavell, as well as Bruce Waibel and Jerry McCoy. The reunited Allman Brothers Band then turned in an electric sixty-minute set that marked their first performance as a band in over four years. The night turned into a veritable greatest hits show, opening with their classic cover of “Statesboro Blues” before performing gorgeous versions of “Blue Sky” and “One Way Out”. They took on the exploratory “In Memory Of Elizabeth Reed”, before the dream set continued with “Ramblin’ Man” and “Jessica”. The night concluded with a raucous take on the band’s traditional show-closer, “Whipping Post”. Later that year, The Allman Brothers played a second show as part of the Crackdown on Crack concert that took place at New York's Madison Square Garden on October 31. The lineup included Allman, Betts, Trucks, Jaimoe, Leavell, Dan Toler and bassist Marty Privette.

1988–2014
A second reformation followed in the summer of 1989 to mark the band's 20th anniversary, with the lineup including the return of Johanson and the addition of guitarist and vocalist Warren Haynes, bassist Allen Woody and keyboardist Johnny Neel. Neel left in 1990, and percussionist Marc Quiñones was added the following year. Both Haynes and Woody left The Allman Brothers Band in April 1997 to devote their attention to Gov't Mule. Their places were taken by Jack Pearson and Oteil Burbridge, respectively, although the former was replaced by Derek Trucks in 1999. Founding member Betts was fired in May 2000 due to alleged ongoing problems with drug abuse, which he claimed were "totally, absolutely, unfounded". He was briefly replaced by Jimmy Herring, and later by the returning Haynes.

In January 2014, Haynes and Trucks announced that they planned to leave The Allman Brothers Band by the end of the year in order to focus on other projects. The group subsequently intended to retire after a string of shows at New York Beacon Theatre in March, but due to Allman suffering bronchitis the dates were postponed. The rescheduled shows were subsequently completed in October. The band's final performance on October 28, 2014, marked the 43rd anniversary of Duane Allman's death, with Trucks playing a number of his guitars to mark the occasion. Since the band's retirement, its two constant members have both died – first, Butch Trucks committed suicide by gunshot on January 24, 2017, and Gregg Allman later died on May 27, 2017, due to complications from liver cancer.

Members

Final line-up

Former members

Timeline

Lineups
All lineup changes taken from the band's official website.

References

External links
The Allman Brothers Band official website

Allman Brothers Band, The